Marglin is a surname. Notable people with the surname include:

Frédérique Apffel-Marglin, American anthropologist
Jessica Marglin, American scholar of Jewish Studies
Stephen Marglin, American economist